Arenga hookeriana (commonly known as the hooker fishtail palm) is a species of flowering plant in the family Arecaceae found in Peninsular Malaysia and Thailand.

References

hookeriana
Flora of Peninsular Malaysia
Flora of Thailand